This page details the all-time statistics, records, and other achievements pertaining to the Toronto Raptors.

Individual accomplishments

All-NBA Team

All-NBA Defensive Team

All-Stars

All-Star Rookie Game

All-Star Rising Stars Challenge Game (formerly known as All-Star Rookie/Sophomore Challenge Game)

Slam Dunk champion

Three Point Shootout champion

NBA Most Valuable Player
 None

NBA Finals Most Valuable Player

NBA Defensive Player of the Year

•  None

NBA Most Improved Player

Retired jerseys
 None

Coach of the Year

Executive of the Year

Rookie of the Year

Sixth Man of the Year

All-Rookie

Conference Player of the Week*

Conference Player of the Month*

Conference Rookie of the Month*

Conference Coach of the Month*

In a rookie season 

 Most points scored by a rookie in one game with 48 – Charlie Villanueva, vs. Milwaukee Bucks, 26 March 2006
 Most points in rookie season – Damon Stoudamire with 1331 points
 Most blocks in rookie season – Marcus Camby with 130 blocks
 Most assists in rookie season – Damon Stoudamire with 653 assists
 Most assists by a rookie in one game with 19 – Damon Stoudamire, vs. Houston Rockets, 2 February 1996
 Most rebounds in rookie season – Chris Bosh with 557 rebounds

Eurobasket

Eurobasket 2007:
 José Calderón (silver)
 Jorge Garbajosa (silver)
Eurobasket 2011:
 José Calderón (gold)
Eurobasket 2013:
 Jonas Valančiūnas (silver)
Eurobasket 2015:
 Jonas Valančiūnas (silver)

World Championship
2002 FIBA World Championship:
 Antonio Davis

2003 FIBA Americas Championship:
 Vince Carter

2006 FIBA World Championship:
 Chris Bosh (bronze)
 José Calderón (gold)
 Jorge Garbajosa (gold)

2010 FIBA World Championship:
 David Andersen
 Leandro Barbosa
 Linas Kleiza (bronze)

2014 FIBA World Championship:
 DeMar DeRozan (gold)
 Jonas Valančiūnas (fourth)

2019 FIBA Basketball World Cup:
 Marc Gasol (gold)

Olympics
1996 Summer Olympics:
 Žan Tabak
2000 Summer Olympics:
 Vince Carter (gold)
2008 Summer Olympics:
 Chris Bosh (gold)
 José Calderón (silver)
 Roko Ukić
2012 Summer Olympics:
 José Calderón (silver)
 Linas Kleiza
 Jonas Valančiūnas
2016 Summer Olympics:
 DeMar DeRozan (gold)
 Kyle Lowry (gold)
 Jonas Valančiūnas
2020 Summer Olympics:
 Aron Baynes 
 Yuta Watanabe

Note: Beginning with the  season the NBA began selecting a Player of the Week, Player of the Month and Rookie of the Month in both the Eastern and Western Conference.  Beginning with the  season the NBA began selecting a Coach of the Month in both the Eastern and Western Conference.  Prior to selecting a winner in each conference a single winner for the entire league was selected for each of the aforementioned awards.

Team records

Regular season
 Most points in a game – 144 vs. Sacramento Kings, 8 January 2021 (W 144–123)
 Most points in a non-OT game – 144 vs. Sacramento Kings, 8 January 2021 (W 144–123)
 Most assists in a game – 40 vs. Charlotte Hornets, 19 November 2019 (W 132–96)
 Most rebounds in a game – 65 vs. New York Knicks, 21 March 1999 (W 85–81 (OT))
 Most blocks in a game – 23 vs. Atlanta Hawks, 23 March 2001 (W 112–86)
 Most steals in a game – 18 vs. Denver Nuggets, 25 February 1997 (W 124–122 (OT))
 Fewest points in a game – 56 vs. Minnesota Timberwolves, 1 November 2003 (L 73–56)
 Fewest assists in a game – 6 vs. Indiana Pacers, 24 February 1999 (L 104–84); vs. Atlanta Hawks, 13 March 1999 (L 86–75)
 Fewest rebounds in a game – 24 vs. Miami Heat, 15 February 1998 (L 116–95); vs. Boston Celtics, 5 November 2014 (W 110-107)
 Most points in a half – 87 (1st Half) vs. Cleveland Cavaliers, 10 April 2021 (W 135-115)
 Fewest points in a half – 23 (1st Half) vs. Washington Wizards, 7 November 2003 (L 86-60); (2nd Half) vs. Miami Heat, 18 April 2012 (L 96–72)
 Most points allowed in a half – 84 (1st Half) vs. Golden State Warriors, 25 March 2011 (L 138-100)
 Fewest points allowed in a half – 22 (2nd Half) vs. Philadelphia 76ers, 4 April 2012 (W 99–78)
 Largest point differential in a half – +40 (77–37) (1st Half) vs. Utah Jazz, 1 December 2019 (W 130–110)
 Largest point deficit in a half – –37 (64–27) (2nd Half) vs. Indiana Pacers, 9 November 2002 (L 108–84)
 Most points in a quarter – 49 (1st Quarter) vs. Denver Nuggets, 14 March 2023 (W 125–110)
 Fewest points in a quarter – 4 (2nd Quarter) vs. Washington Wizards, 7 November 2003 (L 86-60)
 Most points allowed in a quarter – 49 (4th Quarter) vs. Chicago Bulls, 22 December 2014 (L 129-120); (3rd Quarter) vs. Utah Jazz, 1 December 2019
 Fewest points allowed in a quarter – 2 (4th Quarter) vs. Golden State Warriors, 8 February 2004 (W 84–81 (OT))
 Largest point differential in a quarter – +32 (46–14) (3rd Quarter) vs. Golden State Warriors, 2 April 2021 (W 130–77)
 Largest point deficit in a quarter – –27 (42–15) (4th Quarter) vs. Golden State Warriors, 3 December 2013 (L 112–103)
 Most blocks in one half – 16 vs. Atlanta Hawks, 23 March 2001 (W 112–86)
 Fewest points combined in a quarter – 18 vs. Boston Celtics, 12 January 2001 (W 93–72)
 Biggest margin of victory in a home game – 53, vs. Golden State Warriors, 2 April 2021 (W 130-77)
 Biggest margin of victory in a road game – 37, vs. New Jersey Nets, 1 November 2007 (W 106-69)
 Biggest margin of defeat in a home game – 40, vs. Orlando Magic, 29 March 1996 (L 126-86)
 Biggest margin of defeat in a road game – 46, vs New York Knicks, 15 April 1996 (L 125-79) 
 Most points given up in a home game – 140, vs. Phoenix Suns, 31 March 2006; vs. Utah Jazz, 12 November 2012 (3 OT)
 Most points given up in a road game – 152, vs. Los Angeles Clippers, 13 March 1998
 Fewest points given up in a home game – 54, vs. Miami Heat, 19 March 2008
 Fewest points given up in a road game – 64, vs. Detroit Pistons, 23 December 2009
 Fewest points scored by both teams in a half in a home game – 68, vs. Detroit Pistons, 26 March 2008
 Biggest deficit overcome – 30, vs. Dallas Mavericks, 22 December 2019
 Most assists in a game – 39, vs. Indiana Pacers, 15 December 1997
 Most rebounds in a game – 65, vs. New York Knicks, 21 March 1999
 Most blocks – 23, vs. Atlanta Hawks, 23 March 2001
 Most steals – 18, vs. Denver Nuggets, 25 February 1997 (OT)
 Most field goals made – 53, vs. Cleveland Cavaliers, 12 April 2021 (W 135–115)
 Most field goals attempted – 114, vs. Houston Rockets, 11 November 2013 (2 OT)
 Most three-point field goals made in a game – 24, vs. Denver Nuggets, 24 March 2021 
 Most three-point field goals made in a quarter – 8, vs. New Orleans Hornets, 7 November 2009 
 Most three-point field goals attempted in a game – 48, vs. Denver Nuggets, 24 March 2021 
 Most free throws made in a game – 41, vs. Milwaukee Bucks, 18 November 2000
 Most free throws attempted in a game – 49, vs. Milwaukee Bucks, 18 November 2000
 Longest winning streak – 15, 15 January 2020 – 12 February 2020 (Canadian pro-sports record)
 Longest home winning streak – 12, 7 November 2017 – 1 January 2018
 Longest road winning streak – 10, 4 January 2020 – 12 February 2020
 Most 100 or more point game streak – 23, 28 January 2018 – 20 March 2018
 Most total points in a season – 8,762, (2016–17 season)
 Most points per game in a season – 126.3, (2019–20 season)
 Most home game sellouts – 41 out of 41, (2015–16, 2016–17, 2017–18, and 2018–19 seasons)
 Highest winning percentage to finish a season – .736 (53–19), (2019–20 season)
 Most different starting lineups in a season – 38, (2020–21 season) 
 Most players in a season to score at least 30 points in a game – 10, (2020–21 season)

Record for wins

Record for championships

Playoffs
 Most points in a game – 150, vs. Brooklyn Nets, 23 August 2020
 Most points in a half – 77, vs. Brooklyn Nets, 23 August 2020
 Biggest margin of victory in a home game – 36, vs. Philadelphia 76ers, 7 May 2019
 Most points in a home game – 134, vs. Brooklyn Nets, 17 August 2020
 Most points in a half in a home game – 76, vs. Washington Wizards, 17 April 2018
 Most points in a quarter in a home game – 44, vs. Washington Wizards, 17 April 2018
 Most points allowed in a game – 128, vs. Cleveland Cavaliers, 2 May 2018; vs. Cleveland Cavaliers, 7 May 2018
 Most assists in a game – 39, vs. Brooklyn Nets, 23 August 2020
 Most rebounds in a game – 58, vs. Brooklyn Nets, 23 August 2020
 Most blocks in a game – 11, vs. Philadelphia 76ers, 13 May 2001
 Most steals in a game  – 15, vs. Miami Heat, 5 May 2016
 Most field goals made in a game – 56, vs. Brooklyn Nets, 23 August 2020
 Most field goals attempted in a game – 101, vs. Brooklyn Nets, 23 August 2020
 Most three-point field goals made in a game – 22, vs. Brooklyn Nets, 17 August 2020; vs. Brooklyn Nets, 23 August 2020
 Most three-point field goals attempted in a game – 47, vs. Brooklyn Nets, 23 August 2020
 Most free throws made in a game – 33, vs. New York Knicks, 26 April 2001
 Most free throws attempted in a game – 43, vs. Miami Heat, 15 May 2016
 Most points scored from the bench in a game – 100, vs. Brooklyn Nets, 23 August 2020
 Fewest games to win a playoff series – 4 games (4–0 best of 7 series sweep), vs. Brooklyn Nets, 17–23 August 2020

NBA records

Regular season

 Most steals in one half with 8 – Doug Christie (tied with 10 others), vs. Philadelphia 76ers, 2 April 1997
 Longest streak of consecutive two three-pointers per game for a starting centre with 10 – Andrea Bargnani
 Highest free throw percentage in a season with 0.981 – José Calderón, (2008–09 season)
 Most consecutive games with at least one successful 3-point field goal made as a team – 986 consecutive games (February 26, 1999 – January 24, 2011)
 Most players in a season to score 30+ points in a game with 10 – Paul Watson, Stanley Johnson, OG Anunoby, Jalen Harris, Gary Trent Jr. (2), Kyle Lowry (2), Chris Boucher (3), Fred VanVleet (6), Norman Powell (6), Pascal Siakam (9) – (2020–21 season)

Playoffs
 Most consecutive 3-pointers made by a player in a half with 8 (first half) – Vince Carter vs. Philadelphia 76ers, 11 May 2001
 Most 3-pointers made by a player in a half with 8 (first half) – Vince Carter vs. Philadelphia 76ers, 11 May 2001
 Most consecutive 3-pointers made by a player in a game with 8 (tied with Chris Paul) – Vince Carter vs. Philadelphia 76ers, 11 May 2001
 Most free throws in an NBA Finals game without a miss with 16-of-16 from the free throw line – Kawhi Leonard vs. Golden State Warriors, 2 June 2019
 Most 3-pointers by a bench player in the NBA Finals with 16 – Fred VanVleet vs. Golden State Warriors, 30 May 2019 – 13 June 2019
 Most points from the bench in a game – 100 vs. Brooklyn Nets, 23 August 2020

Other accomplishments and records
 First team in NBA history to sweep the three monthly awards (Eastern Conference):  Player of the Month (Chris Bosh), Rookie of the Month (Andrea Bargnani) and Coach of the Month (Sam Mitchell), January 2007
 First non-American team to win an NBA title, 2019
 First team to win an NBA title without a lottery pick, 2019
 Longest single-season championship reign – 486 days, 13 June 2019 – 11 October 2020
 First team in NBA history to play 5 players for 50+ minutes in a game during the shot clock era – Gary Trent Jr. (55:39), Scottie Barnes (56:20), Pascal Siakam (56:31), OG Anunoby (55:49), Fred VanVleet (53:31)  vs. Miami Heat – 29 January 2022

Franchise records for regular season

Games played

Most games played all-time
(Correct as of 24 February 2023)

Most consecutive games played
(Correct as of 27 March 2022)

Most consecutive seasons played

(Correct as of 2022–23 season)

Minutes

Most minutes played all-time
(Correct as of 24 February 2023)

Most minutes played in a game
(Correct as of 11 April 2022)

Most minutes played in a season
(Correct as of 11 April 2022)

Highest minutes per game all-time
(Correct as of 6 December 2022)

Highest minutes per game in a season
(Correct as of 11 April 2022)

Points

Most points scored all-time

(Correct as of 24 February 2023)

Most points scored in a game
(Correct as of 21 December 2022)

Most points scored in a half
(Correct as of 11 February 2022)

Most points scored in a quarter
(Correct as of 11 February 2022)

Most points scored in a season
(Correct as of 15 December)

Highest points per game all-time (minimum 100 games played)
(Correct as of 24 February 2023)

Highest points per game in a season (minimum 58 games played)
(Correct as of 24 February 2023)

Most number of consecutive games with at least 30 points
(Correct as of 1 February 2022)

Most points scored by a bench player
(Correct as of 24 February 2023)

Rebounds

Most rebounds all-time
(Correct as of 24 February 2023)

Most defensive rebounds all-time
(Correct as of 24 February 2023)

Most offensive rebounds all-time
(Correct as of 24 February 2023)

Most rebounds in a game
(Correct as of 25 October 2022)

Most rebounds in a half
Correct as of 24 February 2023

Most rebounds in quarter
Correct as of 23 March 2021

Most rebounds in a season
(Correct as of 3 May 2021)

Highest rebounds per game all-time (minimum 100 games played)
(Correct as of 30 March 2021)

Highest rebounds per game in a season (minimum 58 games played)
(Correct as of 11 April 2022)

Assists

Most assists all-time
(Correct as of 24 February 2023)

Most assists in a game
(Correct as of 4 March 2021)

Most assists in a season
(Correct as of 22 April 2021)

Highest assists per game all-time (minimum 100 games played)
(Correct as of 24 February 2023)

Highest assists per game in a season (minimum 58 games played)
(Correct as of 22 April 2021)

Blocks

Most blocks all-time
(Correct as of 24 February 2023)

Most blocks in a game
(Correct as of 25 November 2021)

Most blocks in a season
(Correct as of 16 May 2021)

Highest blocks per game all-time (minimum 100 games played)
(Correct as of 16 May 2021)

Highest blocks per game in a season (minimum 58 games played)
(Correct as of 16 May 2021)

Steals

Most steals all-time
(Correct as of 24 February 2023)

Most steals in a game
(Correct as of 22 April 2021)

Most steals in a season
(Correct as of 11 April 2022)

Highest steals per game all-time
(Correct as of 24 February 2023)

Highest steals per game in a season (minimum 58 games played)
(Correct as of 11 April 2022)

Field goals

Most field goals made all-time
(Correct as of 24 February 2023)

Most field goals made in a game
(Correct as of 24 February 2023)

Most field goals made in a season
(Correct as of 11 April 2022)

Most field goals attempted all-time
(Correct as of 24 January 2023)

Most field goals attempted in a game
(Correct as of 9 March 2022)

Most field goals attempted in a season
(Correct as of 22 April 2021)

Highest field goal percentage all-time (minimum 500 makes)
(Correct as of 16 May 2021)
 Amir Johnson – 57.2%
 Jonas Valančiūnas – 55.9%
 Rasho Nesterović – 54.8%
 Ed Davis – 54.7%
 Oliver Miller – 50.9%
 Serge Ibaka – 50.3%
 Keon Clark – 49.9%
 James Johnson – 49.8%
 Jerome Williams – 49.7%
 Kawhi Leonard – 49.6%
 Pascal Siakam – 48.8%

Highest field goal percentage in a season (minimum 300 makes)
(Correct as of 22 April 2021)
 Jonas Valančiūnas – 57.2% (2014–15 season)
 Jonas Valančiūnas – 56.8% (2017-18 season)
 Jonas Valančiūnas – 56.5% (2015-16 season)
 Amir Johnson – 56.2% (2013-14 season)
 Jonas Valančiūnas – 55.7% (2016-17 season)
 Amir Johnson – 55.4% (2012-13 season)
 Pascal Siakam – 54.9% (2018-19 season)
 Jonas Valančiūnas – 53.1% (2013-14 season)
 Serge Ibaka – 52.9% (2018-19 season)
 Oliver Miller – 52.6% (1995-96 season)

Three point field goals

Most three point field goals made all-time
(Correct as of 24 February 2023)

Most three point field goals made in a game
(Correct as of 31 January 2022)

Most three point field goals in a half
(Correct as of 2 February 2021)
 Fred VanVleet – 8, vs. Orlando Magic, 2 February 2021
 Terrence Ross – 7, vs. Los Angeles Clippers, 26 January 2014; Danny Green – 7, vs. Memphis Grizzlies, 19 January 2019

Most three point field goals in a quarter 
(Correct as of 26 September 2020)
 Danny Green – 7, vs. Memphis Grizzlies, (3rd quarter) 19 January 2019

Most three point field goals made in a season 
(Correct as of 11 April 2022)

Most three point field goals attempted all-time
(Correct as of 24 February 2023)

Most three point field goals attempted in a game
(Correct as of 24 February 2023)
 Donyell Marshall – 19, vs. Philadelphia 76ers, 13 March 2005
 Dee Brown – 18, vs. Milwaukee Bucks, 28 April 1999
 Terrence Ross – 17, vs. Los Angeles Clippers, 25 January 2014 ; Kyle Lowry – 17, vs. Charlotte Hornets, 17 December 2015 ; Fred VanVleet – 17, vs. New Orleans Pelicans, 9 January 2022

Most three point field goals attempted in a season
(Correct as of 11 April 2022)
 Fred VanVleet – 642 (2021–22 season)
 Kyle Lowry – 596 (2017–18 season)
 Kyle Lowry – 547 (2015–16 season)
 Gary Trent Jr. – 545 (2021-22 season)
 Kyle Lowry – 500 (2013–14 season)
 Damon Stoudamire – 496 (1996–97 season)
 Fred VanVleet – 476 (2020–21 season)
 Kyle Lowry – 468 (2016–17 season)
 Kyle Lowry – 466 (2019-20 season)
 C. J. Miles – 454 (2017–18 season)

Highest three point percentage (minimum 50 three point field goals made) 
(Correct as of 26 March 2021)
 Matt Thomas – 45.7%
 Danny Green – 45.5%
 Jason Kapono – 44.7%
 Mike James – 44.2%
 Steve Novak – 42.6%
 Anthony Parker – 42.4%
 Matt Bonner – 42.1%
 Donyell Marshall – 41.0%
 Lamond Murray – 40.6%
 Tracy Murray – 40.6%

Highest three point percentage in a season (minimum 82 makes; 55 makes between 1997-2013)

(Correct as of 26 March 2021)
 Jason Kapono – 48.3% (2007–08 season)
 Danny Green – 45.5% (2018–19 season)
 Mike James – 44.2% (2005–06 season)
 Anthony Parker – 44.1% (2006–07 season)
 Norman Powell – 43.9% (2020-21 season)
 Anthony Parker – 43.8% (2007–08 season)
 Jose Calderon – 42.9% (2007-08 season); Jose Calderon – 42.9% (2012-13 season)
 Jason Kapono – 42.79% (2008-09 season)
 Dell Curry – 42.76% (2000-01 season)

Most consecutive games with at least a three point field goal made
(Correct as of 16 April 2021)

Free throws

Most free throws made all-time
(Correct as of 24 February 2023)

Most free throws made in a game
(Correct as of 15 February 2022)

Most free throws made in a season
(Correct as of 23 April 2021)

Most free throws attempted all-time
(Correct as of 24 February 2023)

Most free throws attempted in a game
(Correct as of 2 February 2021)
 Vince Carter – 27, vs. Phoenix Suns, 30 December 2000
 DeMar DeRozan - 25, vs. Portland Trail Blazers, 4 March 2016
 Chris Bosh – 24, vs. Phoenix Suns, 22 December 2007
 Chris Bosh – 23, vs. Golden State Warriors, 4 April 2010
 Chris Bosh – 20, vs. Charlotte Bobcats, 20 March 2009; vs. Detroit Pistons, 4 December 2009; vs. Indiana Pacers, 11 January 2010 DeMar DeRozan – 20, vs. Indiana Pacers, 31 March 2017

Most free throws attempted in a season
(Correct as of 13 December 2022)

Highest free throw percentage all-time (minimum 200 makes)
(Correct as of 24 February 2023)
 José Calderón – 87.7%
 Fred VanVleet – 86.6%
 Lou Williams – 86.1%
 Kawhi Leonard – 85.45%
 Jarrett Jack – 84.7%
 Gary Trent Jr. – 84.3%
 T. J. Ford – 83.732%
 Mike James – 83.728%
 Norman Powell – 83.0%
 Anthony Parker – 82.9%
 DeMar DeRozan – 82.74%
 Joey Graham – 82.73%

Highest free throw percentage in a season (minimum 125 makes)
(Correct as of 16 May 2021)
 José Calderón – 98.1% (2008–09 season)
 Fred VanVleet – 88.5% (2020–21 season)
 Kyle Lowry – 87.5% (2020–21 season)
 Fred VanVleet – 87.4% (2021–22 season)
 Andrea Bargnani – 87.3% (2011–12 season)
 Norman Powell – 86.5% (2020–21 season)
 Lou Williams – 86.1% (2014-15 season)
 Alan Anderson – 85.7% (2012–13 season); Kyle Lowry (2019–20)– 85.7%
 Kawhi Leonard – 85.5% (2018–19 season)
 Kyle Lowry – 85.44% (2017–18 season)
 Jalen Rose – 85.38% (2004–05 season)
 DeMar DeRozan – 85.0% (2015–16 season)
 Fred VanVleet – 84.8% (2019-20 season)

Most consecutive free throws made

(Correct as of 22 September 2020)
 José Calderón – 87

Double doubles

Most double doubles all-time
(Correct as of 24 February 2023)

Most double doubles in a season
(Correct as of 13 November 2022)
 Chris Bosh – 49 (2009–10 season)
 Chris Bosh – 43 (2008–09 season)
 Chris Bosh – 42 (2006–07 season)
 Antonio Davis – 37 (2000–01 season); Damon Stoudamire – 37 (1995–96 season)
 Donyell Marshall – 36 (2003–04 season)

Triple doubles

Most triple doubles all-time
(Correct as of 3 February 2023)

Plus/minus

Highest plus/minus in a game
(Correct as of 7 March 2022)

Highest plus/minus in a season
(Correct as of 23 March 2022)

Highest plus/minus all-time
(Correct as of 24 February 2023)

Franchise records for playoffs
Unless otherwise stated, statistics/records are correct as of the 2022 NBA playoffs.

Most games played (playoffs)

Most minutes played (playoffs)

Most minutes played in game (playoffs)

Most points (playoffs)

Most points in a game (playoffs)

Most points scored in a half (playoffs)

Most points scored in a quarter (playoffs)

Most points scored in an overtime period (playoffs)

Most points in a playoff run

Most rebounds (playoffs)

Most rebounds in a game (playoffs)

Most assists (playoffs)

Most assists in a game (playoffs)

Most blocks (playoffs)

Most blocks in a game (playoffs)

Most steals (playoffs)

Most steals in a game (playoffs)

Most double doubles (playoffs)
 Jonas Valančiūnas – 17
 Antonio Davis – 12
 Pascal Siakam – 12
 Kyle Lowry – 11
 Kawhi Leonard – 9
 Chris Bosh; Serge Ibaka – 5

Most field goals made (playoffs)

Most field goals made in a game (playoffs)

Most field goals attempted (playoffs)

Most field goals attempted in a game (playoffs)

Most three point field goals made (playoffs)

Most three point field goals made in a game (playoffs)

Most free throws made (playoffs)

Most free throws made in a game (playoffs)

Most free throws attempted (playoffs)

Most free throws attempted in a game (playoffs)

Franchise record for wins

Franchise record for championships

Notes

External links
Points Record
Field Goals Records
Rebound Records
Assists Records
Free Throw Records
Raptors game notes

References

records
National Basketball Association accomplishments and records by team